Fleury F. Sullivan (1870 – January 1, 1951) was an American politician from Maryland. He served as a member of the Maryland House of Delegates, representing Harford County, from 1910 to 1911.

Early life
Fleury F. Sullivan was born in 1870 on a farm near Magnolia in Harford County, Maryland, to Thomas Sullivan. He attended public schools until he was 16 years old.

Career
Sullivan worked for the telegraph department of the Baltimore and Ohio Railroad starting in 1891. He worked there for 50 years.

Sullivan was a Democrat. Sullivan served as a member of the Maryland House of Delegates, representing Harford County, from 1910 to 1911. Sullivan pushed for an eight-hour law for telegraphers to be introduced in 1906 and 1907 by Walter R. McComas. He was one of the Democratic candidates for the House of Delegates in 1911, after a tie vote in the primary with Joseph W. Archer. Archer would withdraw from nomination. Sullivan was a candidate in the 1915 election for the House of Delegates.

Sullivan blamed his loss in the 1916 race on Democratic leadership. It created a political feud that lasted for 20 years. In 1940, it caused a rift between him and Robert H. Archer. Sullivan supported Howard Bruce while his son Paul L. Sullivan supported George L. P. Radcliffe for the U.S. Senate. Later, his son would support Herbert O'Conor for the senate while Sullivan would switch positions and support Radcliffe.

Sullivan served as vice chairman of the Order of Railroad Telegraphers for fifteen years.

Personal life
Sullivan married Elizabeth A. Linsenmyer. He had three sons and two daughters, Paul L., Joseph C., Francis A., Elizabeth and Florence. They lived at Van Bibber, Maryland. His son, Francis A. was reported missing in Germany by Sullivan. He was found dead weeks later having drowned after falling off a ferry.

Sullivan had a heart attack on December 25, 1950. Sullivan died on January 1, 1951, at his home in Edgewood, Maryland. He was buried at the cemetery adjoining St. Francis Church in Abingdon, Maryland.

References

External links

1870 births
1951 deaths
People from Harford County, Maryland
Democratic Party members of the Maryland House of Delegates
Baltimore and Ohio Railroad people